Bakhra is a village in Muzaffarpur district in the Indian state of Bihar.

It is the site of an Aśoka column that was still standing in 1932 and a stupa.

References 

Villages in Muzaffarpur district